Yuldashevo (Yuldaş) is a rural locality (a selo) in Kunakbayevsky Selsoviet, Uchalinsky District, Bashkortostan, Russia. The population was 683 as of 2010. There are 18 streets.

Geography 
Yuldashevo is located 11 km northwest of Uchaly (the district's administrative centre) by road. Iltebanovo is the nearest rural locality.

References 

Rural localities in Uchalinsky District